The Dutch Athlete of the Year is an annual award given to competitor in the sport of athletics from the Netherlands by the Royal Dutch Athletics Federation (Atletiekunie). A shortlist is drawn up by a group of Atletiekunie officials and sports journalists and then goes to a vote to all its members. 

The award was inaugurated in 1933 as the Sauer Cup. This was renamed to the KNAU Cup in 1946, as the eponymous Sauer had collaborated with the Nazis during World War II. Initially a mixed gender award, the best Dutch male and female athletes were recognised separately from 1959 onwards. The men's award was called the Herman van Leeuwen Cup during this period. Since 2007, the awards have been known as the Dutch Athlete of the Year, and since 2018, it is again mixed gender award.

Junior athletes also gained recognition through the mixed gender Fanny Blankers-Koen plaque since 1951. From 1959 male and female athletes were recognised separately; junior male athletes gained recognition through the Albert Spree Cup. These were replaced in 2006 by a mixed gender junior award known as the Talent of the Year. Since 2018 this award is merged with the Dutch Athlete of the Year award. In years between 2011 and 2018 also separate award for para athletes existed.

Winners
Sauer Cup

KNAU Cup

Herman van Leeuwen Cup and KNAU Cup

Athlete of the Year

See also
Dutch Sportsman of the year
Dutch Footballer of the Year
The Amsterdam Sports Award

References

Athletics in the Netherlands
Dutch sports trophies and awards
Awards established in 1933
1933 establishments in the Netherlands
Annual sporting events in the Netherlands